Christopher Rose (born January 9, 1957) is a professor of engineering and associate provost at Brown University in Rhode Island and a founding member of WINLAB at Rutgers University in New Jersey. He was educated at the Massachusetts Institute of Technology; SB'79, SM'81, Ph.D'85 all in Course VI (Electrical Engineering and Computer Science). On September 2, 2004, an article by Christopher Rose and Gregory Wright, titled Inscribed matter as an energy-efficient means of communication with an extraterrestrial civilization, appeared on the cover of Nature with the headline "Dear ET...".

The article argued that wireless communication is an inefficient means for potential communication over interstellar distances owing to both the unavoidable reduction of signal strength as distance squared and that information can be densely encoded (inscribed) in matter.  The article also suggested that information-bearing physical artifacts might be a more likely first form of contact with an extraterrestrial civilization than radio signals. Following the publication, Rose and Wright's idea was featured by a number of news sources including the BBC World Service, National Public Radio and The New York Times with an article by Dennis Overbye  and a subsequent editorial.
   Rose also offered related commentary on the library carried aboard the SpaceIL Beresheet Lunar Lander.

Rose is an IEEE Fellow cited for "Contributions to Wireless Communication Systems Theory", winner of the 2003 IEEE Marconi Prize Paper Award in wireless communications, and the recipient of the IEEE 2022 Undergraduate Teaching Award.

Christopher Rose was born in New York City and raised in Harlem and Co-op City. Related to Tricia Rose (sister).

Notes

External links 
 Personal Homepage
 Inscribed matter as an energy-efficient means of communication with an extraterrestrial civilization, Christopher Rose & Gregory Wright, Nature 431, 47–49 (2004);  
  Press coverage
 Marconi Prize Paper Awards Site
 IEEE Education Society Undergraduate Teaching Award Site

1957 births
Living people
Brown University faculty
People from Co-op City, Bronx
People from Harlem
MIT School of Engineering alumni